The Occupational Safety, Health And Working Conditions Code, 2020 is a code to consolidate and amend the laws regulating the Occupational safety and health and working conditions of the persons employed in an establishment. The Act replaces 13 old central labour laws.

The bill was passed by the Lok Sabha on 22 September 2020, and the Rajya Sabha on 23 September 2020. The bill received the presidential assent on 28 September 2020, but the date of coming into force is yet to be notified in the official gazette.

Background

The bill was formulated according to the Report and Recommendations of the Second National Commission on Labour.

It amalgamated The Factories Act, 1948, The Plantations Labour Act, 1951, The Mines Act, 1952, The Working Journalists and other Newspaper Employees (Conditions of Service and Miscellaneous Provisions) Act, 1955, The Working Journalists (Fixation of Rates of Wages) Act, 1958, The Motor Transport Workers Act, 1961, The Beedi and Cigar Workers (Conditions of Employment) Act, 1966, The Contract Labour (Regulation and Abolition) Act, 1970, The Sales Promotion Employees (Condition of Service) Act, 1976, The Inter-State Migrant workmen (Regulation of Employment and Conditions of Service) Act, 1979, The Cine Workers and Cinema Theatre Workers Act, 1981, The Dock Workers (Safety, Health and Welfare) Act, 1986 and The Building and Other Construction Workers (Regulation of Employment and Conditions of Service) Act, 1996.

See also
 The Code on Social Security, 2020
 Code on Wages, 2019
 Industrial Relations Code, 2020

References

Internal migration in India
Acts of the Parliament of India 2020
Indian labour law
Occupational safety and health law